Bizhanabad-e Sofla may refer to:
Azizabad, Rudbar-e Jonubi
Bizhanabad-e Do